Mangalur block is a revenue block of Cuddalore district of the Indian state of Tamil Nadu. This revenue block consist of 67 panchayat villages. It is the biggest block in Cuddalore district.

List of Panchayat Villages

References 

Revenue blocks of Cuddalore district